Penne-d'Agenais (Languedocien: Pena d’Agenés) is a commune in the Lot-et-Garonne department in south-western France. Penne-d'Agenais station has rail connections to Périgueux and Agen.

See also
Communes of the Lot-et-Garonne department

References

Pennedagenais